Julianne Pierce is an Australian new media artist, curator, art critic, writer, and arts administrator. She was a member of the groundbreaking group VNS Matrix. She went on to become a founding member of the Old Boys Network, another important cyberfeminist organisation. She has served as executive director of the Australian Dance Theatre and is Chair of the Emerging and Experimental Arts Strategy Panel for the Australia Council. Pierce was executive director of the Australian Network for Art and Technology (ANAT) from 2000 to 2005, based in Adelaide, and was Executive Producer of Blast Theory from 2007 to 2012, based in Brighton in the UK.

On cyberfeminism 
As documented in Hawthorne and Klein's  1999 book Cyberfeminism, VNS Matrix is often credited with inventing the term cyberfeminism and Pierce argues that the term emerged spontaneously in a number of places at once.

Julianne Pierce is a regular commentator on the early work of VNS Matrix and cyberfeminism new media art. "Cyberfeminism was about ideas, irony, appropriation and hands-on skilling up in the data terrain. It combined a utopic vision of corrupting patriarchy with an unbounded enthusiasm for the new tools of technology. It embraced gender and identity politics, allowing fluid and non-gendered identities to flourish through the digital medium. The post-corporeal female would be an online frontier woman, creating our own virtual worlds and colonising the amorphous world of cyberspace."

Curated works 
Future Languages (Adelaide Festival, 1994)
Code Red (ANAT/Performance Space national tour, 1997)
Biomachines (Adelaide Festival, 2000)
Spectrascope (Biennale of Sydney, Performance Space, August 2000)

References

Further reading 
Pierce, Julianne. "Info heavy cyber babe." First Cyberfeminist International Reader, Hamburg: Old Boys Network (1998).
Pierce, Julianne. "Australian new media: an active circuit." Artlink 21.3 (2001): 14.
Pierce, Julianne. "Guest Editorial: New Media-New Collaborations." Dance Forum. Vol. 15. No. 2. Australian Dance Council, 2005.
Tofts, Darren. "Writing media art into (and out of) history." Re: live: 161.

Living people
Australian women artists
New media artists
People from South Australia
Year of birth missing (living people)